Spacewarp is a line of build-it-yourself, marble-run toy "roller coasters" first made in the 1980s by Bandai. Users cut lengths of track to the correct size from a single roll of thick plastic tubing, forming curves and loops held in place by plastic track rail holders which attach to metal rods held vertical in a black plastic base. Steel balls roll around the track and on to a battery-powered screw conveyor that takes them to the top to start all over again.

Production of Spacewarp toys ended around 1988. Replacement parts were sold until 1995.

A redesigned Spacewarp toy was re-introduced to the Japanese market in 2005 by Tanomi.    Improvements included redesigned parts which were less prone to breakage.

History
The first Spacewarp sets became available in Japan in 1983 and were sold by Bandai. That year, filmmakers were working on a movie called The Family Game which features a plot line about a boy who is fascinated with roller coasters. The filmmakers noticed the Spacewarp toy and decided to incorporate it into the movie in a few scenes. The movie The Family Game was released in Japan in November, 1983 to favorable reviews. Due to the popularity of the movie, Spacewarp sales increased so much that between 1983 and 1984, approximately one million sets were sold.

Due to the product's popularity, Spacewarp applied for and received the Spacewarp trademark in the United States of America in 1986, and started selling a subset of its marble roller coasters there.

Sets
1986-1990s North American Imports:

1983-1995 Japanese Market:

2004–2008 Japanese Market:

Accessories
Additional accessories include lighting kits, a staircase, bell ringer, escalator and more.

Knock-Offs
As with many popular toys, nearly identical counterfeit editions have emerged under the Chinese "Spacerail" brand.  However, Spacerail acquired the Spacewarp trademark, and is continuing their tradition of running marble roller coasters.

Spacerail sets:

See also
 Rolling Ball Sculpture

References

External links
 
 
 
 
 
 

Bandai brands
Construction toys